Jonathan Sposato (born March 17, 1967) is an American businessman. He is the chairman and co-founder of Geekwire, an American technology news website, the CEO of the PicMonkey, and investor in companies including Pokitdok, EveryMove and Vizify. He founded, grew and sold two companies (Picnik and Phatbits) to Google.

Early life and career
Sposato graduated from Whitman College in 1989 and serves on the Whitman College Board of Trustees. Sposato is also the author of Better Together: 8 Ways Working with Women Leads to Extraordinary Products and Profit.

Personal life
The University of Washington his Sposato's efforts around gender equality in 2017 with its "Man of Integrity Award." Seattle Business Magazine profiled him as one of Seattle's most influential people of 2015.

Sposato is the co-chair of United Way of King County's fundraising campaign to address homelessness in Seattle.

References

1967 births
Living people
21st-century American businesspeople
21st-century American male writers
American chief executives
American company founders
American feminist writers
Businesspeople from Seattle
Whitman College alumni
Whitman College faculty
Writers from Seattle